The 420s decade ran from January 1, 420, to December 31, 429.

Significant people

References